Joshua Jeremiah Sanches (born 8 July 1998) is a Dutch professional footballer who plays as a midfielder for Dutch Eerste Divisie club TOP Oss.

Club career

Sparta Rotterdam
On 24 May 2018, Sanches signed a two-year contract with Sparta Rotterdam with an option to extend the contract for another year.

He made his Eerste Divisie debut for Sparta Rotterdam on 19 October 2018 in a game against Roda JC Kerkrade as a 42nd-minute substitute for Fankaty Dabo.

TOP Oss
On 29 August 2020, Sanches signed with TOP Oss as a replacement for injured Philippe Rommens. He made his debut on 5 September in a 0–3 loss to Roda JC Kerkrade, coming on as a substitute in the 61st minute for Mateo Aramburú. He finished his first season at the club with 21 appearances, in which he scored two goals.

Personal life
Born in the Netherlands, Sanches is of Cape Verdean and Surinamese descent.

References

External links

1998 births
Footballers from Amsterdam
Living people
Dutch footballers
Association football midfielders
AFC Ajax players
Amsterdamsche FC players
SC Heerenveen players
Sparta Rotterdam players
TOP Oss players
Eerste Divisie players
Tweede Divisie players
Dutch people of Cape Verdean descent
Dutch sportspeople of Surinamese descent